Nirmal is a town and the district headquarters of Nirmal district in the Indian state of Telangana. It is famed for its toys made out of wood.

The district headquarters is located in the town of Nirmal. It borders the Telangana districts of Adilabad, Nizamabad, Mancherial, Asifabad, Jagtial districts as well as Nanded district of the state Maharashtra.

Near by Towns Bhainsa , Narsapur G

Geography 
It has an average elevation of 340 metres (1100 feet) on the foot hills of Nirmal range, which is located in the Deccan plateau.

Demographics 
In the 2011 Indian census, the total population of Nirmal was 88,433. There are 44,053 males (49.82%) and 44,380 females (50.18%). 10,303 children are below 6 years of age. There 5,315 males and 4,988 females. . As per the house hold survey conducted by Telangana government in August 2014, the population of Nirmal  is 116,800.

Major languages  are Telugu, and English. 
Telugu has been the official language since 1956.

Government and politics

Civic administration 

It is one of the oldest municipalities in Telangana. Nirmal Municipality was constituted in 1952 and is classified as a second grade municipality with 36 election wards. On June 28, 2019 Telangana Government has increased No. of Election Wards to 42 with the merging of surrounding two gram panchayats namely Manjulapur and Venkatapur in Nirmal Municipality.

Politics 

Nirmal Assembly constituency is a constituency of Telangana Legislative Assembly, India.It comes under Adilabad (Lok Sabha constituency) along with six other Assembly constituencies.  The first elections of nirmal constituency were held in 1957 with India's first national general election.

References 

Cities and towns in Nirmal district
Mandal headquarters in Adilabad district